Penn State Harrisburg Library (Middletown, Pennsylvania, USA) is an academic library which serves Penn State Harrisburg, the Harrisburg (or Capital) campus of the Pennsylvania State University. It is one of more than 20 libraries in Pennsylvania State University Libraries system. Penn State Harrisburg Library is located at 351 Olmsted Drive and is open more than 90 hours per week (including nights and weekends) . In addition to a print collection, the library provides numerous online resources.

Services

The library's primary users are students and faculty of Penn State Harrisburg. To get started, new student, staff, and faculty must have a Penn State Access Account  and password, and must register with the library . Adult residents of Pennsylvania may apply for a “community borrower” card and a Friends of Penn State Account  which provides limited access to the library's resources.

Services highlights

 Research assistance (available through IM, e-mail, telephone, walk-in, and appointments)
 In-class instruction on literature/information seeking techniques 
 Productive environment for learning, study, and scholarly collaboration
 Cultural activities and educational programs (usually focused on literature, reading, or finding information)

Collections

Facilities and Equipment

A medium-sized college library serving residential and commuter students, the Penn State Harrisburg Library intends to be a place where students can work comfortably and collaborate effectively. The library adapts to emerging technology while providing friendly, face-to-face service. The building is a  facility and opened in January, 2000. The Library Guide  provides contact information, instructions for using the building's wireless network, and a floor-by-floor map.

Facilities highlights

 Archives and Special Collections (3rd floor) 
 Art supplies, die-cutting machine, digital cameras, loaner laptops, portable DVD players, and other borrowable equipment (1st floor)
 Assistive Technologies Room (1st floor) 
 “Cyber Café,” which is open 24/7 and includes several computers and vending machines (1st floor)
 Group Study Rooms (on the perimeter of each floor)
 Library Instruction Room, with computers for 35 students (1st floor)
 Morrison (Art) Gallery, with space for large meetings and art exhibitions (1st floor)
 Schwab Family Holocaust Reading Room, a research and collaborative space for Holocaust studies (1st floor)
 Wireless network access

References
Access PA home page .
Associated College Libraries of Central Pennsylvania home page .
American Library Directory, 60th ed. Medford, NJ: Information Today, 2007, p. 2046.
Goodrich, Katie. "Learn About the Big House of Books." Capital Times, April 30, 2007, p. 1, 4.
Information and Technology Services, Pennsylvania State University. "Penn State Access Account". Accessed July 5, 2007.
"Local PSU To Get New Library." Patriot News, May 1, 1997, p. A1, A16.
OCLC home page .
Pennsylvania Academic Library Consortium home page .
University Libraries, Pennsylvania State University. "University Libraries Lending Code", June 3, 2005. Accessed July 5, 2007.

External links
CAT (Penn State University Libraries Catalog) .
Penn State Harrisburg (Capital Campus) home page .
Penn State Harrisburg Library home page .
Penn State University Libraries home page .

Library buildings completed in 2000
Libraries in Pennsylvania
University and college academic libraries in the United States